The fourth album of Les Luthiers, released in November 1976. From now on, there are no individual credits for the songwriters, although it's been confirmed later that both 'Teresa y el oso' and 'Doctor Bob Gordon...' were composed by Ernesto Acher, with script (on the former) by Marcos Mundstock. 'Serenata Mariachi' originated from Lopez Puccio and Maronna, and then it was revised lyrically by Mundstock and musically by Acher. As for 'Mi aventura por la India' and 'La yegua mia', actual authorship has never been officially confirmed, and the public's relied on educated guesses.

Track listing

Side one
 "Teresa y el oso"

Side two
 "Mi aventura por la India"
 "La yegua mía"
 "Doctor Bob Gordons shops hot dogs from Boston"
 "Serenata Mariachi"

Les Luthiers albums
1976 albums